Azara is a municipality in the province of Huesca, Spain. In 2018, it had a population of 174 inhabitants. It is located in the middle of a valley named after Alferche, to the right of the La Clamor Canyon, surrounded by sandstone the highest among which is Peña de Santa Margarita, 40 km away from Huesca.

Administration

Recent Mayors of Azara

Electoral results

Demography

Monuments
 The Santa Lucia Church 
 Peña/Piedra Santa Margarita (Azara) was an old castle belonging to Arabs. For lieutenant it had to Barbatuerta immediately after the reconquista (1101-4), and in times of Labaña (1610) it belonged to Sanjuanistas de Barbastro.

Feasts
 Major feast is celebrated from 13 December to 16 December in honour of Santa Lucía.
 Easter Monday.
 Cultural Days of June.

References

External links 

 auto

Municipalities in the Province of Huesca